Among IBM-related offerings, 1015 may refer to:

 Code page 1015, the Portuguese code page for an IBM-compatible PC
 IBM 1015 (terminal), a defunct display screen for the IBM System/360